The Chevrolet Series AC International is an American vehicle manufactured by Chevrolet in 1929 to replace the 1928 Series AB National. In all, 1,328,605 Series ACs were manufactured in a range of ten body styles, with 73,918 from Oshawa. The Series AC was distinguished from the AB by the introduction of a new six-cylinder engine, the first Chevrolet with a six-cylinder since the 1915 Chevrolet Series C Classic Six. Advertised as "A Six for the price of a Four", it was only $10 more than the outgoing four-cylinder Series AB ($ in  dollars ). To simplify production operations, each factory was designated one body style for national consumption and shipped by railroad to major American cities. The serial number of origin was relocated to the right body sill underneath the rubber floormat except for the roadster and phaeton, which were inscribed on the right side of seat frame. Prices listed started at US$525 for the roadster or phaeton ($ in  dollars ) to US$725 for the Landau Convertible ($ in  dollars ).

Specification

The Series AC was powered by Chevrolet's new overhead valve  six-cylinder engine, producing  @ 2400 rpm. The engine became known as the "Stovebolt Six" because single-slot screws were used to attach covers for the pushrod and overhead valves to the engine block. The Oakland Six flathead was replaced by the Oakland V8 in 1929 and the companion junior brand Pontiac was introduced in 1926 with the Series 6-27 and the split-flathead Pontiac straight-6 engine, making room for Chevrolet to offer their new Chevrolet straight-6 engine. Further up the brand hierarchy Oldsmobile Six continued to be offered until 1938, having been introduced in 1917.

Standard items included a banjo-style rear axle, single plate dry disc clutch, four wheel mechanical brakes with pressed steel 20" disc wheels. Options offered were front and rear bumper, to be considered standard equipment in later years, rear mounted extendable trunk rack, heater for passenger compartment, cigar lighter, and the introduction of a hood ornament. In May of 1925 the Chevrolet Export Boxing plant at Bloomfield, New Jersey was repurposed from a previous owner where Knock-down kits for Chevrolet, Oakland, Oldsmobile, Buick and Cadillac passenger cars, and both Chevrolet and G. M. C. truck parts are crated and shipped by railroad to the docks at Weehawken, New Jersey for overseas GM assembly factories.

See also
1929 Cadillac Series 314
1929 LaSalle Series 303
1927 Oldsmobile Model 30
1929 Buick Master Six
1929 Buick Standard Six

References

Series AC International
Cars introduced in 1929
1920s cars